The Sibelius was a train run daily by VR between Helsinki, Finland, and St. Petersburg, Russia. The service began on 31 May 1992 to ease congestion on the night service Repin after the fall of the Soviet Union increased traffic on the border. Travel times between the two cities were originally over 6 hours, but they reached 5 hours and 12 minutes in 2002 and dropped further to 5 hours and 6 minutes in 2006.

The service, along with Repin, was discontinued on 12 December 2010 when it was replaced by the new high speed service Allegro. Some of the carriages of the train were supposed to be used on regular traffic between Helsinki and Joensuu on IC 5/12 starting on 31 October 2011, but their introduction was delayed until 10 January 2012 due to pending homologation from the Finnish Transport Safety Agency (TraFi). For instance, the bogies of the carriages had to be changed.

See also 
 Sm6 Allegro

References

External links 
 Sibelius on the VR website

Named passenger trains of Russia
Named passenger trains of Finland
International named passenger trains
Railway services introduced in 1992
Railway services discontinued in 2010